Vatara Thana is an upscale thana of Dhaka city, the capital of Bangladesh. Pragoti Sarani falls under Vatara Thana. Its areas include Basundhara Residential Area, Vatara, Solmaid, Nurerchala, Khilbarirtek, Kalachandpur, and Kuril.

See also
 Upazilas of Bangladesh
 Districts of Bangladesh
 Divisions of Bangladesh

References

Thanas of Dhaka